The Adventures of Seinfeld & Superman is a pair of advertisement films promoting American Express, featuring Jerry Seinfeld as himself and Patrick Warburton (who appeared with Seinfeld on Seinfeld, as David Puddy) as the voice of Superman. The two films, A Uniform Used to Mean Something... and Hindsight is 20/20, each about five minutes in length, were directed by Barry Levinson. In addition to being on the Internet, they aired on television during 2004 on TBS. In addition to promoting American Express, the premise of the films were to show Seinfeld and Superman as friends, and much of the humor originated from the various situations the two found themselves in. For example, Superman is anticipating hooking up Seinfeld's TV to surround sound, although he has super-hearing as Jerry points out.

References

External links
 , complete with both episodes. (Requires Flash)
 
 

Superman films
American Express
Advertising campaigns
Animated superhero crossover films
2003 works
American short films
Short films based on DC Comics
American films with live action and animation